Kinard may refer to:

Places
Kinard, Florida
Kinards, South Carolina
Kinard Middle School, a middle school in Fort Collins, Colorado
Caledon, County Tyrone, historically known as Kinnaird, a village and townland in Northern Ireland

People
Chris Kinard, American badminton player 
Felim O'Neill of Kinard, Irish nobleman
Frank Kinard, American football player
J. Spencer Kinard, American journalist and singer
John Kinard, American activist
Terry Kinard, American football player